Aftershock 2005 is the fourth album by the funk band Mutiny. The album was initially released in 1996 by the Polystar label in Japan, and then by Rykodisc Records in the U.S. and UK. The album possesses a more rock-oriented feel than previous Mutiny albums. The album features guest appearances from former P-Funk bandmates Bernie Worrell and Michael Hampton. "Aftershock 2005" was one of the last albums released through producer Bill Laswell's Black Arc series.

Track listing and personnel

The Growl (5:10)
Bass – Linn Washington
Drums-Jerome Brailey
Guitars-Kevan Wilkins, Skitch Lovette, Chris Beasley
Turntables and Sounds-DXT
Keyboards-Juan Nelson

It's All Good (5:20)
Guitar solo- Nicky Skopelitis
Drums-Jerome Brailey
Bass-Jeff Cherokee Bunn
Guitars-Kevan Wilkins, Skitch Lovette, Chris Beasley
Vocals-Fashe Forde 
Background vocals-Fashe Forde, Kevan Wilkins

No Choice(4:25)
Guitar – Michael Hampton
Keyboards – Bernie Worrelll
Programmed By – D-Tech, Jerome Brailey
Vocals – Clarence Allen, Derrick Ross, John Burnett
Turntables-DXT
Instruments-J Romeo and D-Tech

Passion (5:12)
Vocals-Fashe Forde 
Guitar – Michael Hampton, Chris Beasley, Kevan Wilkins
Keyboards – Bernie Worrell, Juan Nelson
Drums-Jerome Brailey
Bass-Jeff Cherokee Bunn
Background vocals-Fashe Forde

Tickin' Like A Time Bomb (4:47)
Programmed By – D-Tech, Jerome Brailey
Vocals – Derrick Ross, Sean Sally
Instruments-J Romeo, D-Tech

Rock The Boat (2:51)
Bass – Allen Flowers "Quick" 
Guitar – Jim Prideaux, Wilbur Harris
Sampler – B.C. Seville, Jerome Brailey
Vocals – Brian Champion
Drums-Jerome Brailey

2005 (5:51)
Vocals-Fashe Forde 
Drums-Jerome Brailey
Guitars-Chris Beasley, Kevan Wilkins
Bass-Jeff Cherokee Bunn
Turntables-DXT

Desires (5:23)-inspired by Eddie Hazel
Backing Vocals – Jerome Brailey
Bass – Allen Flowers "Quick"
Guitar – Jim Prideaux, Wilbur Harris
Keyboards – Craig Day
Vocals – Wilbur Harris

Moments (2:52)
Keyboards – Craig Day
Vocals-Fashe Forde

The Growl (Revamp) (1:56)

Mutiny (funk band) albums
1996 albums
Albums produced by Bill Laswell
Rykodisc albums